Badminton at the 2022 Maccabiah Games was held at the Darca School in Daliyat al-Karmel, Israel from 17 to 19 July 2022.

Competition schedule

Medals

Medal table

Medalists

Notes

References

Badminton at the Maccabiah Games
2022 Maccabiah Games events
2022 in badminton
Badminton tournaments in Israel